Terence Richard Wyatt (born 29 June 1957)  is a Professor in the School of Physics and Astronomy at the University of Manchester, UK.

Education
Wyatt was educated at Queen Elizabeth's Grammar School, Tamworth, Imperial College London (Bachelor of Science) and St Edmund Hall, Oxford where he was awarded a Doctor of Philosophy degree in 1983 for research supervised by Robin Devenish at the University of Oxford.

Career and research
Wyatt's conducts research in particle physics primarily on the DØ experiment at the Tevatron proton-antiproton collider in Fermilab and on the ATLAS experiment at the Large Hadron Collider proton-proton collider in CERN.
 
He was one of three short-listed candidates for the position of CERN Director General in 2014, with Fabiola Gianotti and Frank Linde.

Awards and honours
Wyatt was elected a Fellow of the Royal Society (FRS) in 2013. His certificate of election reads: 

Wyatt was also awarded the James Chadwick Medal and Prize from the Institute of Physics (IOP) in 2011.

References

Academics of the University of Manchester
Living people
Fellows of the Royal Society
Alumni of Imperial College London
Alumni of St Edmund Hall, Oxford
1957 births
British physicists
People associated with CERN